The Tumen River, also known as the Tuman River or Duman River, is a  long river that serves as part of the boundary between China, North Korea and Russia, rising on the slopes of Mount Paektu and flowing into the Sea of Japan. The river has a drainage basin of 33,800 km2 (13,050 sq mi).

The river flows in northeast Asia, on the border between China and North Korea in its upper reaches, and between North Korea and Russia in its last  before entering the Sea of Japan. The river forms much of the southern border of Jilin Province in Northeast China and the northern borders of North Korea's North Hamgyong and Ryanggang provinces. Baekdu Mountain on the Chinese-North Korean border is the source of the river, as well as of the Amnok River, also called the Yalu River (which forms the western portion of the border of North Korea and China).

The name of the river comes from the Mongolian word tümen, meaning "ten thousand" or a myriad. This river is badly polluted by the nearby factories of North Korea and China; however, it still remains a major tourist attraction in the area. In Tumen, Jilin, a riverfront promenade has restaurants where patrons can gaze across the river into North Korea. The Russian name of the river is Tumannaya, literally meaning foggy.

In 1938 the Japanese built the Tumen River Bridge, where the Quan River meets the Tumen River, between the villages of Wonjong (Hunchun) and Quanhe. Important cities and towns on the river are Hoeryong and Onsong in North Korea, Tumen and Nanping (in the county-level city of Helong) in China's Jilin province.

In 1995, the People's Republic of China, Mongolia, Russia, North Korea and South Korea signed three agreements to create the Tumen River Economic Development Area.

Noktundo

Noktundo, a former island (now effectively a peninsula) at the mouth of the Tumen, has been a boundary contention between Russia and North Korea. The Qing Dynasty ceded the island to Russia as part of the Primorsky Maritimes (East Tartary) in the 1860 Treaty of Peking. In 1990, the former Soviet Union and North Korea signed a border treaty which made the border run through the center of the river, leaving territory of the former island on Russian side. South Korea refuses to acknowledge the treaty and demanded that Russia return the territory to Korea.

Illegal crossings
The Tumen has been crossed for years by North Korean refugees defecting across the Chinese border. Most refugees from North Korea during the 1990s famine crossed over the Tumen River, and most recent refugees have also used it, as it is far easier than crossing the Amnok.

The river is considered the preferred way to cross into China because, unlike the swift, deep and broad Amnok River which runs along most of the border between the two countries, the Tumen is shallow and narrow. In some areas it can be crossed on foot, or by short swims. It also freezes in winter allowing dry crossings.

Defectors who wish to cross the Tumen often ignore its pollutants and dangerous border patrol, and spend weeks if not months or years waiting for the perfect opportunity to cross. "Long, desolate stretches of the Chinese-North Korean border are not patrolled at all", according to a New York Times article.

Refugees rarely cross the Tumen into Russia. This is because Russia's short stretch of the river is far better patrolled than China's stretch. In addition, the rewards for doing so aren't as high since the ethnic Korean community in Russia is far smaller to receive sufficient support from, as opposed to China, which has a larger Korean population.

The Tumen is also crossed illegally by soldiers and others seeking food and money. Some Chinese villagers have left the border area because of the attacks.

The history of conflict in the area (examples include incidents during the Battle of Lake Khasan) was alluded to in singer Kim Jeong-gu's song 'Tearful Tumen River (눈물 젖은 두만강)', which became an ode to families separated by such tragedies and by defections during the Korean War. The humanitarian crisis along the Tumen River was dramatized in the 2010 feature-length film Dooman River.

Notes

References

Citations

Sources 
 
Nianshen Song. 2018. Making Borders in Modern East Asia: The Tumen River Demarcation, 1881–1919. Cambridge University Press.

External links 
 

Rivers of North Korea
Rivers of Jilin
Rivers of Primorsky Krai
International rivers of Asia
Border rivers
China–North Korea border
North Korea–Russia border
Geography of Yanbian
Drainage basins of the Sea of Japan